The 2012 Pitch and putt World Cup was held on the Royal Meath course (Ireland) and was the fourth edition for this championship promoted by the Federation of International Pitch and Putt Associations (FIPPA), with 11 national teams. Ireland won their second World Cup after defeating Australia in the final.

Qualifying round

Second round

Places 9-11

Final rounds

Final standings

See also
Pitch and Putt World Cup

References

 2012 WC Results

External links
Federation of International Pitch and Putt Associations

Pitch and putt competitions